Charles Sidney Grodin (April 21, 1935 – May 18, 2021) was an American actor, comedian, author, and television talk show host. Grodin began his acting career in the 1960s, appearing in TV serials including The Virginian. After a small part in Rosemary's Baby in 1968, he played the lead in Elaine May's The Heartbreak Kid (1972) and supporting roles in Mike Nichols's Catch-22 (1970), the 1976 remake of King Kong, and Warren Beatty's Heaven Can Wait (1978).

Known for his deadpan delivery and often cast as a put-upon straight man, Grodin became familiar as a supporting actor in many Hollywood comedies of the era, including Real Life (1979), Seems Like Old Times (1980), The Great Muppet Caper (1981), Ishtar (1987), Dave (1993), and Clifford (1994). Grodin co-starred in the action comedy Midnight Run (1988) and in the family film Beethoven (1992). He made frequent appearances on The Tonight Show with Johnny Carson and Late Night with David Letterman.

In the mid-1990s, Grodin retired from acting and wrote autobiographies; he became a talk show host on CNBC and in 2000 a political commentator for 60 Minutes II. He returned to acting with a handful of roles in the mid-2010s, including in Louis C.K.'s FX show Louie and Noah Baumbach's film While We're Young (2014).

Grodin won several awards, including the Primetime Emmy Award for Outstanding Writing for a Variety Special in 1978 for the Paul Simon Special alongside Chevy Chase, Lorne Michaels, Paul Simon, and Lily Tomlin. He was also nominated for a Golden Globe Award for Best Actor – Motion Picture Musical or Comedy for The Heartbreak Kid in 1972. He won Best Actor at the 1988 Valladolid International Film Festival for Midnight Run, and the American Comedy Award for Funniest Supporting Actor in a Motion Picture for his performance in Dave in 1993.

Early life
Grodin was born in Pittsburgh, Pennsylvania, to Orthodox Jewish parents, Theodore (1900–1953), who owned a store that sold wholesale supplies, and Lena (1907–1996; née Singer), who worked in her husband's business and volunteered for disabled veterans. His paternal grandfather had changed the family name from Grodinsky to Grodin. His maternal grandfather was an immigrant from Russia who "came from a long line of rabbis" and moved to Baltimore at the turn of the 20th century. Grodin had an older brother named Jack.

Grodin graduated as valedictorian from Peabody High School, where he was elected class president all four years. He attended the University of Miami but left without graduating to pursue acting. He studied acting at HB Studio in New York City under Uta Hagen.

Career

1950s/1960s: Early career
Grodin's film debut was an uncredited bit part in Disney's 1954 film 20,000 Leagues Under the Sea. A student of Lee Strasberg and Uta Hagen, he made his Broadway debut in a production of Tchin-Tchin, opposite Anthony Quinn. In 1965, he became an assistant to director Gene Saks and appeared on several television series including The Virginian.
Grodin had a small but pivotal part playing an obstetrician in the 1968 horror film Rosemary's Baby. In 1964, he played Matt Stevens on the ABC soap opera The Young Marrieds. During the late 1960s, he also co-wrote and directed Hooray! It's a Glorious Day...and All That, a Broadway play, and directed Lovers and Other Strangers and Thieves, also on Broadway. He also directed Simon and Garfunkel's television special Songs of America in 1969. However, he turned down the part of Benjamin Braddock in The Graduate because of the low salary offered by producer Lawrence Turman, although Turman assured him that the part would make him a star, as it ultimately did for Dustin Hoffman.

1970s/1980s
After a supporting role in the 1970 comedy film Catch-22, Grodin gained recognition as a comedy actor when he played the lead role in the 1972 film The Heartbreak Kid. Grodin subsequently appeared in several films during the decade, including the 1976 version of King Kong, the hit 1978 comedy Heaven Can Wait, and Albert Brooks's 1979 comedy Real Life. He both starred in and wrote the screenplay for 11 Harrowhouse (1974). During the 1970s, he also frequently appeared on Broadway and was involved in producing several plays.

In 1981, he landed a role in The Great Muppet Caper playing Nicky Holiday, a jewel thief who falls in love with Miss Piggy. He also appeared that same year opposite Lily Tomlin in The Incredible Shrinking Woman. His 1980s roles included Neil Simon's Seems Like Old Times (opposite Chevy Chase and Goldie Hawn) and 1988's well-reviewed comedy Midnight Run, a buddy movie co-starring Robert De Niro. Grodin also appeared in the 1986 CBS prime-time-soap sendup Fresno, playing the evil son of a raisin matriarch (Carol Burnett).

His Hollywood film roles of the 1980s usually saw him cast as uptight, bland, and world-weary white collar professionals, such as a psychiatrist having a nervous breakdown (The Couch Trip), a health conscious accountant (Midnight Run), an ineffectual advertising executive (Taking Care of Business), and a lonely, socially awkward nerd (The Lonely Guy). He was cast against this type as a scheming CIA agent in Ishtar.

Commenting on his work with regard to Ishtar, Hal Hinson in The Washington Post observed: "Grodin has a one-of-a-kind quality on the screen, a sort of inspired spinelessness. And with his cat-burglar rhythms – he seems to play all his scenes as if someone were asleep in the next room – he's become a very sly scene-stealer." Sandra Brennan at Rovi noted that: "Whereas many funnymen have been popular for their ability to overreact and mug their way around everyday obstacles, Grodin belonged, from the beginning, to the Bob Newhart school of wry comedy that values understatement and subtlety."

Aside from his film work, he was a frequent presence on television. In 1977, Grodin hosted an episode of the NBC sketch show Saturday Night Live, where the entire episode revolved around his forgetting that the show was live, and he proceeded to wreck sketches because of his failure to prepare accordingly. His many talk show appearances from the 1970s to the early 2020s often included confrontational and mock angry segments. At one time Johnny Carson "banned" him from The Tonight Show appearances after taking offense at things Grodin had said. The NBC network would receive angry letters from viewers who didn't understand the joke that he was playing a persona, trying to be as different from typical talk show guests as possible. His appearances on Late Night With David Letterman would sometimes erupt into shouting and name-calling, but Letterman always enjoyed Grodin's segments.

1990s/2000s: Family films and talk show host

Grodin's career took a turn in 1992, when he played the nervous family man George Newton in the kids' comedy Beethoven, opposite Bonnie Hunt. The film was a box-office hit, and he reprised the role in the 1993 sequel, Beethoven's 2nd. Also in 1993, Grodin played the role of Harrison Winslow in the film Heart and Souls. After a supporting role in the acclaimed Ivan Reitman comedy Dave, Grodin signed on to play The Old
Man in the 1994 limited release sequel to A Christmas Story, It Runs in the Family (a.k.a. My Summer Story). That same year also saw the much-delayed release of Clifford, in which Grodin portrayed the frustrated uncle opposite Martin Short's title role.

From 1995 to 1999, Grodin hosted his own issues-orientated cable news talk show, The Charles Grodin Show. It originated as a nightly show on CNBC, replacing Tom Snyder after he left to start The Late Late Show on CBS. The show was dropped by CNBC in 1998, but aired for a final year as a weekly show on MSNBC before ending its run in late 1999. From 2000 to 2003, he was a political commentator for 60 Minutes II.

In 2004, Grodin wrote The Right Kind of People, an off-Broadway play about co-op boards in certain buildings in Manhattan. Grodin's commentaries were heard on New York City radio station WCBS and other affiliates of the CBS Radio Network, as well as on the CBS Radio Network's Weekend Roundup.

After a 12-year-long hiatus from film, in 2006 Grodin returned to acting in the comedy The Ex starring Zach Braff.

2010s: Career resurgence 
In the 2010s, Grodin made more frequent acting appearances, guest starring on television shows such as Law and Order: Special Victims Unit and The Michael J. Fox Show. Grodin had several supporting roles in films, including Barry Levinson's The Humbling (2014) and Taylor Hackford's The Comedian (2016). He had a prominent supporting role in Noah Baumbach's While We're Young (2015), playing a celebrated documentary filmmaker and the father of one of the lead characters.

In 2015, Grodin was cast in a recurring role in Louis C.K.'s FX show Louie as Dr. Bigelow, C.K.'s philosophical doctor and mentor in Season 4 and 5. In an interview with Deadline, Grodin talked about his relationship with C.K. stating, "I find him to be the single most talented person ... I've ever worked with, he's a wonderful director, writer, and actor."

He also portrayed the philanthropist and defrauded investor Carl J. Shapiro in the 2016 miniseries Madoff on ABC based on the Bernie Madoff Ponzi scheme debacle. His final movie was An Imperfect Murder: The Private Life of a Modern Woman, released in 2017.

Grodin was also a prolific author and published his final book in 2013.

Personal life
Grodin had two children: daughter Marion (a comedian), from his marriage to Julie Ferguson, and son, Nicholas, from his marriage to Elissa Durwood. For a period in the 2000s, Grodin gave up show business to be a stay-at-home dad to his children.

Death
Grodin died from multiple myeloma at his home in Wilton, Connecticut, on May 18, 2021. He was 86.

Filmography

Film

Television

Theatre

Awards and nominations

Bibliography 
Plays
 Grodin, Charles. Price of Fame: A Play. New York: Samuel French, 1991. .
 Grodin, Charles. One of the All-Time Greats: A Comedy. New York: S. French, 1992. .
 Grodin, Charles. The Right Kind of People. New York: Samuel French, 2008. .

Books
 Grodin, Charles. It Would Be So Nice If You Weren't Here: My Journey Through Show Business. New York: Morrow, 1989. .
 Grodin, Charles. How I Get Through Life: A Wise and Witty Guide. New York: Morrow, 1992. .
 Grodin, Charles. Freddie the Fly. New York : Random House, 1993. .
 Grodin, Charles. We're Ready for You, Mr. Grodin: Behind the Scenes at Talk Shows, Movies, and Elsewhere. New York: Charles Scribner's Sons, 1994. .
 Grodin, Charles. I Like It Better When You're Funny: Working in Television and Other Precarious Adventures. New York: Random House, 2002. .
 Grodin, Charles. If I Only Knew Then... Learning from Our Mistakes. New York: Springboard Press, 2007. .
 Grodin, Charles. How I Got to Be Whoever It Is I Am. New York: Springboard Press, 2009. .
 Grodin, Charles. Just When I Thought I'd Heard Everything: Humorous Observations on Life in America. Santa Monica, Calif: Homina Publishing, 2013. .

In popular culture 

Grodin is mentioned as a hero of Mac and Dennis in an episode of It's Always Sunny in Philadelphia.

He was referenced in three different episodes of The Simpsons ("I'm Spelling as Fast as I Can", "Little Big Girl" and "Mathlete's Feat").

The Rick and Morty episode, “Mortynight Run”, is a reference to the film. In the episode, Jerry watches the film with other Jerrys from parallel universes.

In the Seinfeld episode "The Doll" Jerry Seinfeld buys a bottle of sauce because the brand's mascot bears a resemblance to Grodin.

References

External links

 
 
 
 
 
 Charles Grodin profile in The New York Observer
 Charles Grodin's radio commentaries at WCBS880.com
 "The Heartfelt Kid: Actor/Playwright Charles Grodin Premiers New Play in San Francisco", Jewish News Weekly, November 26, 2004.
 Charles Grodin Urges New Yorkers To Mentor Kids
 Interview with Charles Grodin

1935 births
2021 deaths
20th-century American male actors
21st-century American male actors
American male comedians
American male film actors
American male stage actors
American male television actors
American people of Russian-Jewish descent
American television talk show hosts
CNBC people
Jewish American male actors
Jewish American writers
Jewish theatre directors
Male actors from Pittsburgh
Male actors from Virginia
Writers from Virginia
People from Wilton, Connecticut
Primetime Emmy Award winners
University of Miami alumni
Jewish American male comedians
20th-century American comedians
21st-century American comedians
Comedians from Pennsylvania
Deaths from cancer in Connecticut
Deaths from multiple myeloma
21st-century American Jews